This is a survey of the postage stamps and postal history of Transvaal, formerly known as the South African Republic (Zuid-Afrikaansche Republiek, ZAR).

1869–1877
The first stamps of the South African Republic were issued on 1 May 1870, showing the coat of arms of the republic.

1877–1880

The South African Republic was annexed by Britain in 1877. A set of definitives depicting Queen Victoria was issued in 1878.

1882–1897
The first Anglo-Boer War broke out in 1880. The conflict ended with a decisive Boer victory at the Battle of Majuba Hill and the republic regained its independence.

The republic again issued stamps with the coat of arms in the designs.

1900–1909

The Second Boer War erupted in 1899, the war ended the existence of the South African Republic.

Stamps of the South African Republic were overprinted "V.R.I." (Victoria Regina Imperatrix, Latin for Victoria, Queen and Empress) or "E.R.I." (Edward Rex Imperator, for Edward VII) between 1900 and 1902. In 1902 stamps for the Transvaal Colony were issued.

Transvaal was incorporated into the Union of South Africa in 1910 .

See also
Adolph Otto
Emil Tamsen
Revenue stamps of Transvaal
Postage stamps and postal history of South Africa

References

Further reading
J. H. Curle & A. E. Basden. (1940) Transvaal Postage Stamps. London: Royal Philatelic Society.

External links

Transvaal Study Circle
Stamp Domain – South Africa
Transvaal: 1870 imperforate 1/- deep green, an unused tête-bêche pair. British Library Philatelic Collections

Transvaal
Postal system of South Africa